Goreaphobia, formed by Alex Bouks and Chris Gamble in 1988, is the first American death metal band from Philadelphia and one of the first to emerge from the east coast scene.  They never released a full-length record until after breaking up and reforming, only a demo cassette and 2 7-inch EP's.  Due to this fact, and their influence on later bands, Goreaphobia has reached a cult status in the underground, with demand for their merchandise still very high.  The band played many shows in the early 1990s, and toured with Immolation on their 1992 "tour of possession".

After Goreaphobia's breakup, drummer Craig Smilowski joined Immolation, and Chris Gamble went on to form Blood Storm.  Guitarist Alex Bouks joined Incantation.

The band re-united after 15 years of separation in 2007.  After reforming they released their debut album, Mortal Repulsion in 2009.

Members
Chris Gamble - Bass / Vocals (Blood Storm,Absu)
Alex Bouks - lead guitar (Immolation,Ex-Incantation,Ruinous)
Jim Roe - Drums (Disciples Of Mockery,Ex-Incantation)
VJS - Guitar (Nightbringer,Incursus,Adaestuo,Sargiest)

Former members
Drums:
Craig Smilowski RELLIK(www.rellik.us),(Immolation),
"Big" Mike
Ken Masteller

Vocals:
Kevin Brennan RIP
Jack Gannon
Craig Pillard (Incantation)

Bass:
Jay Lawrence
Gary Gahndi
Julian Lawrence

Guitar:
Henny Piotrowski
John Litchko
John Arcucci RIP
Spencer Murphy
John McEntee - Guitar (Incantation)

Releases
Morbidious Pathology (1990) (demo tape - self released)
Morbidious Pathology (1990) (7-inch EP on Seraphic Decay Records)
Omen of Masochism (1992) (7-inch EP on Relapse Records)
Vile Beast of Abomination (2006) (Necroharmonic)Mortal Repulsion (2009) (Ibex Moon)Apocalyptic Necromancy (2011)

References

External links
Tartarean Desire

Heavy metal musical groups from Pennsylvania
Relapse Records artists
American musical trios
Musical groups established in 1988
American death metal musical groups
Musical groups from Philadelphia